Pukawa or Pukawa Bay is a bay and a small township on the southern shores of Lake Taupo on New Zealand's North Island. It is off State Highway 41 between Turangi and Taumarunui, in the Taupo District and Waikato region.

It is home of the Ngāti Tūwharetoa hapū of Ngāti Manunui, who established the Pūkawa Marae and Manunui a Ruakapanga meeting house in November 2006. The opening ceremony was attended by Tuheitia Paki, the Māori King.

Pōtatau Te Wherowhero was formally selected as king by a conference of chiefs of the Māori tribes held at Pukawa in April 1857 and was crowned during elaborate ceremonies held at his marae in Ngāruawāhia in April 1858.

In 1906 Ngāti Tūwharetoa and the Tongariro Timber Company struck an agreement for the construction of a 40-mile railway line from Kakahi (on the main trunk line) to Pukawa. This line was never completed.

Demographics
The settlement is part of the larger Lake Taupo Bays statistical area.

The settlement had a population of 213 at the 2018 New Zealand census, an increase of 42 people (24.6%) since the 2013 census, and an increase of 3 people (1.4%) since the 2006 census. There were 99 households, comprising 108 males and 108 females, giving a sex ratio of 1.0 males per female. The median age was 61.2 years (compared with 37.4 years nationally), with 24 people (11.3%) aged under 15 years, 21 (9.9%) aged 15 to 29, 81 (38.0%) aged 30 to 64, and 87 (40.8%) aged 65 or older.

Ethnicities were 81.7% European/Pākehā, 31.0% Māori, 1.4% Asian, and 1.4% other ethnicities. People may identify with more than one ethnicity.

Although some people chose not to answer the census's question about religious affiliation, 49.3% had no religion, 42.3% were Christian, and 1.4% had Māori religious beliefs.

Of those at least 15 years old, 42 (22.2%) people had a bachelor's or higher degree, and 30 (15.9%) people had no formal qualifications. The median income was $30,900, compared with $31,800 nationally. 30 people (15.9%) earned over $70,000 compared to 17.2% nationally. The employment status of those at least 15 was that 66 (34.9%) people were employed full-time, 24 (12.7%) were part-time, and 6 (3.2%) were unemployed.

Lake Taupo Bays statistical area
The statistical area of Lake Taupo Bays covers  square kilometres to the south and west of Lake Taupo. It surrounds but does not include Tūrangi.

Lake Taupo Bays had a population of 1,566 at the 2018 New Zealand census, a decrease of 12 people (−0.8%) since the 2013 census, and a decrease of 54 people (−3.3%) since the 2006 census. There were 645 households, comprising 810 males and 756 females, giving a sex ratio of 1.07 males per female. The median age was 52.8 years (compared with 37.4 years nationally), with 267 people (17.0%) aged under 15 years, 174 (11.1%) aged 15 to 29, 687 (43.9%) aged 30 to 64, and 438 (28.0%) aged 65 or older.

Ethnicities were 69.2% European/Pākehā, 41.0% Māori, 2.5% Pacific peoples, 2.3% Asian, and 1.3% other ethnicities. People may identify with more than one ethnicity.

The percentage of people born overseas was 11.9, compared with 27.1% nationally.

Although some people chose not to answer the census's question about religious affiliation, 48.3% had no religion, 36.4% were Christian, 7.7% had Māori religious beliefs and 1.1% had other religions.

Of those at least 15 years old, 219 (16.9%) people had a bachelor's or higher degree, and 240 (18.5%) people had no formal qualifications. The median income was $28,300, compared with $31,800 nationally. 174 people (13.4%) earned over $70,000 compared to 17.2% nationally. The employment status of those at least 15 was that 552 (42.5%) people were employed full-time, 189 (14.5%) were part-time, and 48 (3.7%) were unemployed.

Notable people 
Bessie Te Wenerau Grace, teacher, first Māori woman university graduate

References

Populated places in Waikato
Taupō District
Bays of Waikato
Populated places on Lake Taupō